Iason Athanasiadis is a writer, photographer, political analyst, and television producer who has contributed to a range of media, including the BBC, Al Jazeera English, and Channel 4. He specializes in the Middle East.

Information
A graduate of Oxford University, Iason has written for the Christian Science Monitor, the Financial Times, the International Herald Tribune, the Sunday Telegraph, The Guardian, the Toronto Star, the Spectator, Newsweek, the Washington Times, the Athens News, and Australia's leading current affairs magazine The Diplomat.

He was a Nieman Fellow at Harvard University from 2007 to 2008.

He was detained in Tehran on 17 June 2009, in the course of his reporting on the disputed Iranian elections.  No details of his alleged crime were released and no charges were made public. He was released after twenty days of incarceration on 6 July 2009.

Iason holds a master's degree from the Tehran School of International Relations.

See also
 List of foreign nationals detained in Iran

References

External links
Iason Athanasiadis's personal website
Nieman Report: A Photo Journalist Immerses Himself in the Story Being Told
Journalisted - Articles by Iason Athanasiadis
Global Greeks - Media

Nieman Fellows
Harvard University faculty
Living people
Greek journalists
Alumni of the University of Oxford
Year of birth missing (living people)